Irwin Yacht and Marine Corporation, often just called Irwin Yachts, was an American boat builder based in St. Petersburg, Florida. The company specialized in the design and manufacture of fiberglass sailboats and became one of the largest producers of sailboats in the United States.

The company was founded by Ted Irwin (June 28, 1940 – February 5, 2015) in 1966 and went through a succession of bankruptcies and subsequent name changes, before finally closing in 1992. The company produced  more than 6,000 boats.

Ted Irwin was a competitive sailboat racer, but the company built many of their boats specifically for the cruising market. Many designs were aimed at the Caribbean yacht charter market, including the Irwin 42, 52 and 65.

History
Irwin was born in Elizabeth, New Jersey in 1940 and developed a passion for sailing at an early age. He built his own Moth and went on to sail it to win the class North American and world championships. He served in the US Coast Guard and also worked for Charley Morgan at Morgan Yachts as a draftsman, illustrator and boat builder. He commenced his first design, the  Voodoo in 1963, a boat that took six months to complete. He raced the boat from 1964 to 1966 and won 24 of the 28 races that he competed in.

Irwin founded his own company, Irwin Yacht & Marine Corporation, in 1966. He ran the company and was also the chief designer. The first design produced was the Irwin 27, in 1967.

To control costs, Irwin bought his supplies in large lots and also owned his factory and the land it was located upon, as well as the production tooling. He also produced everything possible in-house, from the boats' masts, right down to the marketing brochures.

Typical of his cruising boats was the Irwin 41, a  blue-water cruiser introduced in 1982.

In the 1980s, Irwin designed a series of racing boats, all named Razzle Dazzle, that he raced in the Southern Ocean Racing Conference (SORC) in Florida. His 1982 Razzle Dazzle was sold after winning the SORC that year, but the design was the basis for the Irwin 41 Citation, of which four boats were completed. Many years he sold his winning boats, which fetched high prices, using the funds and lessons learned to design better boats for subsequent years.

Irwin encouraged other builders, even when they became competitors. In 1974 he traded the molds for the 1970 model Irwin 32 in exchange for a small number of shares in the fledgling Endeavour Yacht Corporation to get founders John Brooks and Rob Valdes started in the boat building business.

Irwin Yacht & Marine closed in 1992 for the final time.

Ted Irwin died in Little Rock, Arkansas on 5 February 2015, from multiple myeloma, at age 74.

Boats 
Summary of boats built by Irwin Yachts:

Irwin 27 - 1967
Irwin 23 - 1968
Irwin 24 - 1968
Irwin 31 - 1968
Irwin 25 - 1969
Irwin 28 - 1970
Irwin 32 - 1970
Irwin 38-1 - 1970
Irwin 45 - 1970
Irwin 37-1 - 1971
Irwin 43 (1971) - 1971
Irwin 30 Competition - 1972
Irwin 32.5 - 1972
Irwin 37 1 Ton - 1972
Irwin 37 Competition - 1973
Irwin 28 Mk III - 1974
Irwin 33 - 1974
Irwin 10/4 - 1975
Irwin Avanti 42 - 1975
Irwin 1/2 Ton - 1976
Irwin 28 Mk IV - 1976
Irwin 3/4 Ton - 1976
Irwin 30 - 1976
Irwin 33 Mk II - 1976
Irwin 37-2 - 1976
Irwin 37-3 - 1976
Irwin 42 - 1976
Irwin 52 - 1976
Irwin 1/2 Ton Mk II - 1977
Irwin 30 Citation - 1977
Irwin 37-4 - 1977
Irwin 40 Citation - 1978
Irwin Mini-Ton - 1978
Irwin 34 Citation - 1979
Irwin 39 Citation - 1979
Irwin 21 Free Spirit - 1980
Irwin 46 - 1980
Irwin 65/68 - 1981
Irwin 34 - 1982
Irwin 37-5 -1982
Irwin 41 - 1982
Irwin 41 Citation - 1982
Irwin 52-2 - 1982
Irwin 31 Citation - 1983
Irwin 38-2 - 1984
Irwin 43-CC Mk I - 1984
Irwin 32 Citation - 1985
Irwin 43-CC Mk II - 1985
Irwin 35 Citation - 1986
Irwin 38 Citation - 1986
Irwin 43-CC Mk III - 1986
Irwin 44 - 1987
Irwin 52-3 - 1987
Irwin 54 - 1988

See also
List of sailboat designers and manufacturers

References

Irwin Yachts